Nikolai Leonidovich Tsulygin born May 29, 1975) is a retired Russian professional ice hockey player.  Tsulygin was drafted 30th overall by the Mighty Ducks of Anaheim in the 1993 NHL Entry Draft, the Ducks' second ever draft pick behind Paul Kariya and played twenty-two games for Anaheim, scoring one assist and collecting eight penalty minutes during the 1996–97 NHL season.  Tsulygin returned to Russia in 1999 and remained there until his retirement in 2008.

Career statistics

Regular season and playoffs

International statistics

External links

1975 births
Living people
Baltimore Bandits players
Cincinnati Mighty Ducks players
Fort Wayne Komets players
Ak Bars Kazan players
HC CSKA Moscow players
HC Dynamo Moscow players
Metallurg Magnitogorsk players
HC Neftekhimik Nizhnekamsk players
Severstal Cherepovets players
HC Sibir Novosibirsk players
Anaheim Ducks draft picks
Mighty Ducks of Anaheim players
Sportspeople from Ufa
Russian ice hockey defencemen
Salavat Yulaev Ufa players
Torpedo Nizhny Novgorod players